The Maldives national football team has represented the Maldives in international football since 1979. Their first match came against Seychelles at the 1979 Indian Ocean Island Games. The team has never qualified for a major international tournament.

Results

1979

1985

1997
https://en.wikipedia.org/wiki/1998_FIFA_World_Cup_qualification_%E2%80%93_AFC_First_Round

1996
https://en.wikipedia.org/wiki/1996_AFC_Asian_Cup_qualification

2000

2001

2003

2004

2005

2007

2008

2009

2010

2011

2012

2013

2014

2015

2016

2017

2018

2019

2021

2022

References

External links

results